The MNL Myanmar 2012 is the Myanmar National League's third full regular season. The fixture schedule was released on second weeks of December 2011. The season is scheduled to begin on 7 January  2012 and end on 9 September 2012. The bottom two teams are relegated to yet-to-be-formed MNL-2.

Teams

Personnel and kits

Note: Flags indicate national team as has been defined under FIFA eligibility rules. Players may hold more than one non-FIFA nationality.

League table

Top scorers

Awards

Monthly awards

References

External links
Season on soccerway.com

Myanmar National League seasons
1
Myanmar
Myanmar